Rajesh Kumar Singh is an Indian politician, currently a member of the Bhartiya Janata Party and a MLA from Mohiuddinnagar constituency of Bihar.

References 

Living people
1974 births
Bharatiya Janata Party politicians from Bihar
Bihar MLAs 2020–2025